Guryanov or Gurianov is a Russian masculine surname, its feminine counterpart is Guryanova or Gurianova. It may refer to
Denis Gurianov (born 1997), Russian ice hockey winger
Nikolay Guryanov (1909–2002), Russian Orthodox Christian priest

Russian-language surnames